is a Japanese retired para table tennis player. She won a silver medal at the 2000 Summer Paralympics.

She began to need to use a wheelchair at the age of 21 after she experienced an illness that affected both legs.

References

1963 births
Living people
Table tennis players at the 2000 Summer Paralympics
Table tennis players at the 2004 Summer Paralympics
Paralympic medalists in table tennis
Medalists at the 2000 Summer Paralympics
Japanese female table tennis players
Paralympic silver medalists for Japan
Paralympic table tennis players of Japan
Sportspeople from Aichi Prefecture
People from Seto, Aichi